Čenkovo is an uninhabited settlement in Croatia.

Ghost towns in Croatia